The Nablus Governorate is an administrative district of Palestine located in the Central Highlands of the West Bank, 53 km north of Jerusalem. It covers the area around the city of Nablus which serves as the muhfaza (seat) of the governorate. The governor of the district is Mahmoud Aloul.

During the first six months of the First Intifada 85 people were killed in Nablus Governorate by the Israeli army. This was the highest total of all the West Bank Governorates.

Municipalities

Cities

Nablus

Towns
The following localities have populations over 4,000 and municipal councils of 11-15 members.

Aqraba
Asira ash-Shamaliya 
Beita
Huwara
Jammain
Qabalan
Sebastia
Beit Furik

Village councils
The following localities have populations above 1,000 and village councils of 3 to 9 members.

Asira al-Qibliya
Azmut
Awarta
Al-Badhan
Balata al-Balad
Beit Dajan
Beit Hasan
Beit Iba
Beit Imrin
Beit Wazan
Bizziriya
Burin
Burqa
Deir al-Hatab
Deir Sharaf
Duma
Einabus
Furush Beit Dajan
Ijnisinya 
Jurish
Kafr Qallil
Al-Lubban ash-Sharqiya

Majdal Bani Fadil
An-Naqura
An-Naseriya
Odala
Osarin
Qaryut
Qusin
Qusra
Rujeib
Salim
Sarra
As-Sawiya
Talfit
Talluza
Tell
Urif
Yanun
Yasid
Yatma
Zawata
Zeita Jammain

Refugee camps
Askar
Balata
Ein Beit al-Ma'

See also
 Governorates of Palestine

References

Sources
Administrative divisions in the Palestinian Territories
 Nablus Governorate Website

 
Governorates of the Palestinian National Authority in the West Bank